The 1924 Philadelphia Phillies season saw the Phillies climb out of last place and into seventh and home attendance improving to over 299,000. Cy Williams led the team in home runs with 24.

Offseason 
 December 15, 1923: Cotton Tierney was traded by the Phillies to the Boston Braves for Hod Ford and Ray Powell. Powell refused to report to his new team. The Braves sent cash to the Phillies as compensation.

Regular season 
On August 21, 1924, the Phillies were traveling from games in St. Louis to Cincinnati when the Baltimore and Ohio Railroad train on which they were traveling turned over in the train yards in Mitchell, Indiana. Phillies players and personnel were unharmed but the engineer and fireman were killed in the accident.

In the season's final series against the New York Giants at the Polo Grounds, Phillies shortstop Heinie Sand was offered $500 by Giants outfielder Jimmy O'Connell to throw the games. The Giants were battling for the pennant with the Brooklyn Robins. Sand rejected the bribe and reported it to Phillies manager Art Fletcher. It eventually led to the life-time suspension of O'Connell and Giants coach Cozy Dolan by Commissioner Landis, although future-Hall of Famers Frankie Frisch, George Kelly, and Ross Youngs were also implicated.

Season standings

Record vs. opponents

Roster

Player stats

Batting

Starters by position 
Note: Pos = Position; G = Games played; AB = At bats; H = Hits; Avg. = Batting average; HR = Home runs; RBI = Runs batted in

Other batters 
Note: G = Games played; AB = At bats; H = Hits; Avg. = Batting average; HR = Home runs; RBI = Runs batted in

Pitching

Starting pitchers 
Note: G = Games pitched; IP = Innings pitched; W = Wins; L = Losses; ERA = Earned run average; SO = Strikeouts

Other pitchers 
Note: G = Games pitched; IP = Innings pitched; W = Wins; L = Losses; ERA = Earned run average; SO = Strikeouts

Relief pitchers 
Note: G = Games pitched; W = Wins; L = Losses; SV = Saves; ERA = Earned run average; SO = Strikeouts

References

External links 
1924 Philadelphia Phillies season at Baseball Reference

Philadelphia Phillies seasons
Philadelphia Phillies season
Philly